Thumpx (Stylized as THUMPχ) is the fifth studio album by the Japanese pop-rock band Porno Graffitti. It was released on April 20, 2005.

For the first time of the album after the Tama withdrawal, it became the original album of two years and two months, the first time across the best album in between "Worldillia".

Track listing

References

2005 albums
Porno Graffitti albums
Japanese-language albums
Sony Music albums